Stadionul Crișana is a multi-use stadium in Sebiș, Romania. It is used mostly for football matches and is the home ground of Național Sebiș. The stadium holds 1,500 people.

Gallery

References

Football venues in Romania
Buildings and structures in Arad County